Thales de Azevedo State High School (Portuguese: Colégio Estadual Thales de Azevedo) is a public high school located in Salvador, Bahia, Brazil.  It consists of Grades 15–17.

References

Secondary schools in Brazil